The Assembly of French Guiana is the regional legislature of French Guiana.  It was first elected in 2015, replacing the General Council of French Guiana and the Regional Council of French Guiana.

It was established after a 2010 referendum changed the government structure to a single territorial collectivity.  It currently has 55 members.

The current president, Gabriel Serville, was elected to a six-year term in 2021.

Electoral system

There are 8 multi-member electoral sections whose seats are distributed using closed list proportional representation with the highest average method. The lists must have alternation between male and female candidates. There is also a 11-seat majority bonus given to the most-voted list.

In the first round, if a list receives the absolute majority of the votes in the community, they obtain the majority bonus which is distributed amongst the electoral sections. The rest of the 44 seats are distributed proportionally in each section to the lists who have won at least 5% of the votes at the community level.

A second round is held if no list gets the absolute majority in the first. Only the lists that received 10% or more of the votes in the first round can participate. Lists who won at least 5% of the first round votes could merge into the lists participating in the second round. The electoral system used in the first round is also used by the second. However, the majority bonus is given to the list with the most votes, not necessary to acquire the absolute majority.

References

Government of French Guiana
Legislatures of Overseas France